Lucas Deaux (born 26 December 1988) is a French professional footballer who plays as a midfielder for  club Nancy.

Career
Deaux scored his first Ligue 1 goal for Nantes against Rennes on 29 September 2013 in a 3–1 away win for Nantes.

In June 2016, he joined Guingamp on a three-year contract from Belgian side Gent.

On 29 July 2021, he signed a two-year contract with Dijon.

On 13 January 2023, Deaux joined Nancy in Championnat National on a 18-month contract.

References

External links
 

1988 births
Sportspeople from Reims
Footballers from Grand Est
Living people
Association football midfielders
French footballers
Stade de Reims players
FC Nantes players
K.A.A. Gent players
En Avant Guingamp players
Nîmes Olympique players
Dijon FCO players
AS Nancy Lorraine players
Ligue 1 players
Ligue 2 players
Belgian Pro League players
Championnat National players
Championnat National 3 players
French expatriate footballers
French expatriate sportspeople in Belgium
Expatriate footballers in Belgium